Wei Wei may refer to:

 Wei Wei (male writer) (1920–2008), Chinese writer
 Wei Wei (actress) (born 1922), Chinese actress
 Wei Wei (singer) (born 1963), Chinese female singer
 Wei Wei (female writer) (born 1970), Chinese writer
 Wei Wei (comedian) (born 1982), Chinese comedian and one of the Back Dorm Boys
 Wei Wei (basketball) (born 1989), Chinese female basketball player
 Wei Wei (murderer) (1979–2019), Chinese murderer executed in Japan

See also
 Wei Wu Wei (1895–1986), British Taoist philosopher and writer
 Ai Weiwei (born 1957), Chinese artist